Aramon may refer to:
 Aramon (grape)
 Aramon, Gard, a commune in the Gard department in southern France
 Aramón Cerler, a ski resort in Aragon
 One of the realms of Total Annihilation: Kingdoms